Englefield Green is a large village in the Borough of Runnymede, Surrey, England, approximately  west of central London. It is home to Royal Holloway, University of London.

The village grew from a hamlet in the 19th century, when much of Egham ( to the east) was sold by the Crown Estate.

History

The village grew from a hamlet and medieval farmed swathe of land, known as a tithing, of the same name, combined with was a much wider, that is eastern tranche of its area associated with the former Great South West Road and its neighbouring land known as Egham Hill, both in Egham in the 19th century, when much of its land, principally in the western half, was parted with by sale from the Great Park in the Crown Estate.  Parts of it in the west remain Crown Estate, mainly the entire south-east quarter of the Great Park (that non-built-up land seen in the map, shown, which is not in neighbouring Berkshire).

The last duel in England
The last fatal duel in England took place on Priest Hill in 1852. It was between two French refugees, Lt. Frederic Constant Cournet and Emmanuel Barthélemy. Cournet was supposed to have been the better prepared for a sword duel.  Barthelemy, an extremely questionable individual (responsible for at least two murders by 1852), manipulated Cournet into challenging him (supposedly over comments Cournet made about Barthelemy's girlfriend), and chose pistols for the weapon. He killed Cournet, and was subsequently arrested for murder. However, Barthelemy managed to convince the jury that it was not a homicide as in the normal sense of the word, and was acquitted. Barthelemy was widely suspected of being a spy for the new French regime of Emperor Louis Napoleon (Napoleon III). In fact his bullying of other refugees had led to the confrontation with Cournet. However, three years later, he was engaged in a crime in London, possibly involving a blackmail attempt that did not work out. Two men were killed and Barthelemy was arrested. Despite giving an image of bravado in court, this time he was convicted, then hanged. Most criminal historians and writers feel he was repugnant but had defender Victor Hugo, who wrote a small panegryric to him in one of the later sections of Les Misérables, before ultimately also agreeing that "Barthelemy at all times flew one flag only, and it was black."

Air Forces Memorial

On the road north of the halls of residence is the Air Forces Memorial which commemorates by name over 20,000 airmen and women who were lost in the Second World War during operations from bases in the United Kingdom and North and Western Europe, and who have no known graves. They served in Bomber, Fighter, Coastal, Transport, Flying Training and Maintenance Commands, and came from all parts of the Commonwealth, as well as some from countries in continental Europe which had been overrun but whose airmen continued to fight in the ranks of the Royal Air Force. The names in their thousands are inscribed on panels in a courtyard.

The memorial sits on a hill overlooking the celebrated Thames meadow of Runnymede where Magna Carta, enshrining basic freedoms in English law, was signed in 1215. The memorial was designed by Sir Edward Maufe with sculpture by Vernon Hill. The engraved glass and painted ceilings were designed by John Hutton and the poem engraved on the gallery window was written by Paul H Scott. It overlooks the River Thames on Cooper's Hill at Englefield Green between Windsor and Egham on the A328 (Priest Hill), 4 miles from Windsor and is well signposted as 'Air Force Memorial'.

Runnymede Halls of Residence
Just north of the village proper are seven halls. These were last in use for education itself as the 'Runnymede campus' of Brunel University and before which by one of its forebears, Shoreditch College of Education. Today the buildings are used as halls of residence for the main campus at Uxbridge and Royal Holloway, Englefield Green. The halls were named after Shoreditch staff: Scrivens, Marshall, Bradley, Reed and Rowan save for President Hall, where the College president lived, and College Hall that were both named in its Royal Indian Engineering College period. Embellished Neo Gothic and similar style stone and brick mixture buildings, they were built by Sir Matthew Digby Wyatt, who had been Isambard Kingdom Brunel's architect for London Paddington station and Addenbrooke's Hospital, Cambridge, now the Judge Institute. Corridors in President and College Halls were named after prominent British and Anglo-Indian figures, such as George Canning, Warren Hastings, Richard Wellesley and Charles Cornwallis.

In 2007, Brunel advertised the buildings for sale. Royal Holloway looked for provision of a quota of student accommodation to complement its adjacent Kingswood Hall. In June 2007 it was acquired by developer Oracle for £46m. Englefield Green Village Residents Association members voted to remind Runnymede Borough Council that any expansion of buildings should be in keeping with the village architecture and density as locally interpreted.

Gilbert's Statue of Eros on the Shaftesbury Memorial Fountain, Piccadilly Circus, was kept in the college during World War II.

Demography

Governance

Englefield Green is located in the Borough of Runnymede and Weybridge.
It was represented in Parliament by former Conservative MP Philip Hammond from 1997 until his resignation in 2019. It is currently represented by Conservative MP Ben Spencer.

The village is divided into two wards for the purpose of Borough Council elections – East (Cllr Jap Sohi, Cllr Marisa Heath) and West (Cllr Mike Kusneraitis, Cllr Nigel King, Cllr Nick Prescot).  The village is represented on Surrey County Council by Cllr Marisa Heath.

Residents
Marilyn Monroe and Arthur Miller, then newlyweds, spent four months (mid-July to November) in 1956, including their honeymoon, in Parkside House, Englefield Green for the duration of Monroe's work on the film The Prince and the Showgirl with Laurence Olivier.

Saudi billionaire Walid Juffali owned Bishopsgate House and its 42-acre estate from about 2001 until his death in 2016.
Leslie Charteris, author of the Simon Templar novels, spent the final years of his life in Englefield Green, near the Barley Mow.

Gallery

See also
Church of Our Lady of the Assumption, Englefield Green

Notes and references

References

Sources
Englefield Green in Pictures, by Graham Dennis Fernhurst Books (7 Nov 1994)
Englefield Green Picture Book, by Graham Dennis Egham-by-Runnymede Historical Society (Nov 1992)
 Hamill interview

External links

Community website

Villages in Surrey
Borough of Runnymede